Jenő Hubay, Jenő Hubay von Szalatna,  (15 September 185812 March 1937), also known by his German name Eugen Huber, was a Hungarian violinist, composer and music teacher.

Early life

Hubay was born into a German family of musicians in Pest, Hungary. He adopted the Hungarian version of his name, Jenő Hubay, in his twenties, while living in the French-speaking world.

Hubay was trained in violin and music by his father,  (Károly Huber, later ) from Varjas, concertmaster of the  Hungarian Royal Opera House and a teacher at the Budapest College of Music. His mother was of Italian descent. He gave his début public performance playing a concerto at the age of eleven.

At the age of thirteen, Hubay began his studies in Berlin. He remained there for five years, receiving instruction from Joseph Joachim. In 1878, following the advice of Franz Liszt, he made his début in Paris, which was a great success. Sitting in the audience was Henri Vieuxtemps, with whom Hubay formed an intimate friendship and from whom he received instruction.

In 1882 Hubay was employed at the Brussels music institute as the head of the department of violin studies. Returning to Hungary in 1886, he succeeded his father as head of the Liszt Academy. That same year, he established the Budapest Quartet with fellow teacher, cellist David Popper.

Teaching

Hubay's main pupils, aside from Joseph Szigeti and André Gertler, included Eugene Ormandy — who later turned to conducting — and Eugene Lehner. 

He taught many female violinists, including Stefi Geyer, Jelly d'Arányi and Ilona Fehér. Other pupils included Franz von Vecsey, Emil Telmányi, Carl von Garaguly, Zoltán Székely, Tibor Varga, Gerhard Taschner, Ede Zathureczky and the Italians Gianni Pavovich, and Wanda Luzzato. He also taught the African American jazz violinist Eddie South.

Performance
As a soloist, Hubay gained the praise of Vieuxtemps, Johannes Brahms and many others.

As a chamber musician, he formed two string quartets, one while he was in Brussels and one with David Popper during his Budapest (Budapest Quartet) years. With Popper, he performed chamber music on more than one occasion with Brahms, including the premiere of Brahms's Piano Trio No. 3 in C minor, Op. 101.

Among his earliest recordings are ten-inch acoustic discs, dating from 1910, on which he was accompanied by the composer Zsigmond Vincze.

Compositions

Hubay composed four violin concertos and a very large number of encore pieces. His concertos incorporate themes from Hungarian gypsy music, and his "gentle breeze" pieces, which share features of the compositional style of his chamber music partner, David Popper, continue the tradition of the German romantics such as Felix Mendelssohn and Robert Schumann.

Hubay's output also contains several operas, including The Venus of Milo, The Violin-Maker of Cremona, The Mask and Anna Karenina (after Leo Tolstoy). The opening of The Venus of Milo is based on whole tone scales and archaisms that perhaps are meant to suggest the ancient setting.

Legacy
The Hubay prize has been awarded by the Franz Liszt Academy of Music to a number of eminent violinists:
 Gábor Takács-Nagy

Notes

References

External links 
Jenő Hubay Foundation

: video clip from the 1935 film Halló, Budapest! (Hello, Budapest!)

1858 births
1937 deaths
19th-century classical composers
19th-century Hungarian people
19th-century male musicians
20th-century classical composers
20th-century Hungarian people
20th-century Hungarian male musicians
Composers for violin
Franz Liszt Academy of Music alumni
Academic staff of the Franz Liszt Academy of Music
Hungarian classical composers
Hungarian classical violinists
Hungarian-German people
Hungarian male classical composers
Hungarian music educators
Hungarian people of Italian descent
Hungarian Romantic composers
Male classical violinists
People from Pest, Hungary
Pupils of Henri Vieuxtemps
Pupils of Joseph Joachim
Academic staff of the Royal Conservatory of Brussels